Zak Crawley (born 3 February 1998) is an English professional cricketer who plays for Kent County Cricket Club. He plays Test cricket for the England cricket team, having also played One Day Internationals for a short period.

Crawley is a top-order batsman who has been described as "very strong" technically and as a "natural stroke maker". He made his international debut for England in November 2019 in the second Test match of England's tour of New Zealand. Following a score of 267 runs in 2020, he was named as one of the Wisden Cricketers of the Year in the 2021 edition of the almanack.

Early life
Crawley was born in Bromley in south-east London and was educated at New Beacon School and Tonbridge School; his father Terry is a retired City of London futures trader who had begun his working life as a carpet fitter, before becoming one of Britain's highest paid men and making the Sunday Times Rich List following his change of profession. Crawley has represented Kent from under-11 level onwards, is a graduate of the Kent Cricket Academy and played club cricket for Holmesdale Cricket Club, Knockholt Cricket Club and Sevenoaks Vine. He made his Second XI debut for the county in 2013 aged 15 and signed his first professional contract with the club at the end of the 2015 season during which he had become a regular Second XI player and was selected for the England Elite Player Development for London programme. During the 2016–17 English winter Crawley played Western Australian Grade Cricket for Wembley Districts.

Cricket career
Crawley made his senior debut for Kent in the 2017 Royal London Cup against Essex at Canterbury on 17 May 2017. He made his first-class debut for Kent against the touring West Indians on 6 August 2017 during the 166th Canterbury Cricket Week, scoring 62 runs in his debut first-class innings before going on to make his County Championship debut for the county at the end of the same month. After playing in four Championship matches for the county during the tail-end of the season he signed a contract extension with Kent in October 2017.

Crawley was part of Kent squad for the 2017–18 Regional Super50 competition in the West Indies in early 2018. He scored his maiden List A cricket half century in Kent's opening match of the competition against Guyana, scoring 60 runs as an opening batsman, before going on to score 99 not out against the Leeward Islands in the county's third match of the tournament. The match ended in controversial circumstances with the opposing Leeward Islands bowling wide balls in what was seen by some as an attempt to deny Crawley the opportunity to reach his century.

During the 2018 season Crawley became a regular in the Kent side, playing in all of the team's first-class matches as well as occasional limited overs games. He was Kent's third highest run scorer in the County Championship with 755 runs scored at an average of 31.46 runs per innings. After twice being dismissed in the 90s he scored his maiden first-class century in the final home match of the season, making 168 against Glamorgan at Canterbury in September and signed a contract extension at the end of the season before playing New South Wales Grade cricket during the 2018/19 winter. Playing for Sydney Cricket Club, he set a new record for the fastest century scored in the competition, making 100 from 42 balls in the T20 Cup against Sutherland District Cricket Club.

Crawley was drafted by London Spirit for the inaugural season of The Hundred, but only featured once, scoring 64 as an opening batsman in a loss to Birmingham Phoenix. Crawley was retained by the Lord's-based side for the 2022 season. He played for Hobart Hurricanes in the 2022–23 Big Bash League, scoring a half-century on debut in his first appearance in an overseas franchise league.

International call-up
Although averaging less than 35 runs per innings in county cricket in 2018 and 2019, Crawley was seen as a potential international batsman. Following a series of good batting performances at the start of the 2019 season, including scoring two centuries, Crawley made his England Lions debut in a four-day match against an Australian XI in July at Canterbury, the first time he had played for any England side. He scored 820 County Championship runs during the season and, in September 2019, was named in the England cricket team's Test match squad for their 2019/20 tour of New Zealand, one of four uncapped players included in the squad for the tour. After scoring a century in a warm-up match, Crawley was brought into the team for the second Test following an injury to Jos Buttler, making his debut at Seddon Park on 29 November aged 21.

After scoring only one run on debut, batting at number 6, he was retained in the squad for the tour of South Africa in December and January. Following an injury to opening batsman Rory Burns, Crawley made his second Test appearance in the second Test against South Africa, this time opening the batting. His "excellent temperament" and "unflustered" approach were praised as was his bravery against short-pitched bowling, although some technical issues with his batting were also commented on. He made scores of 4 and 25 in the match, but also took two "vital" catches during the final innings of the match. He went on to play in the remaining two matches of the series, scoring his first Test half-century in the final match.

International arrival in 2020
Crawley signed a three-year contract extension with Kent in March 2020. In May, he was named in a group of 55 players to begin training ahead of international fixtures during the COVID-19 pandemic and in June was included in England's 30-man squad to start training behind closed doors for the Test series against the West Indies. He played in the first two Tests of the summer, scoring 76 in the second innings of the first Test to increase his Test match highest score, before playing in the second Test against Pakistan in August, scoring a half-century in a rain-affected match.

He went on to make his maiden Test century in the following match, his eighth Test match, scoring 171 not out on the first day, passing his previous best first-class score in the process. On the second day of the match, Crawley went on to score 267 runs before being stumped, an innings which included a new England fifth wicket record partnership of 359 runs with Jos Buttler. Crawley's 267 became the second-highest maiden century scored by an England batsman in Test cricket, behind R. E. Foster's 287, and he became the third-youngest double centurion for England. Crawley's performances during 2020 led to him being named as one of the Wisden Cricketers of the Year in the 2021 edition of the almanack.

Inconsistent international form in 2021 and 2022
The following winter, Crawley was selected for the England tours of Sri Lanka and India. In the lead up to the Indian series, he sprained his wrist after slipping while exiting the dressing room and missed the first two matches. He returned to the side for the third Test, top-scoring with 53 runs in England's first innings before playing in the home series against New Zealand. His batting in the series included three innings of fewer than five runs and was described as a "torrid time", with his best innings a score of 17 runs.

Following the forced isolation of most of the England One Day International (ODI) squad after a COVID-19 outbreak, Crawley was named in the revised squad for their series against the touring Pakistanis in July 2021. He made his ODI debut in the first match of the series, scoring an unbeaten half-century. In Test matches, however, Crawley's form with the bat remained poor in 2021, and his 16 innings during the year saw 11 single-figure scores and a Test batting average for the year of 10.81.

He lost his place in the team during the summer, but his central contract was renewed and he was retained in the squad for the 2021–22 Ashes series in Australia. He was recalled to the team for the Boxing Day Test at Melbourne, the third of the series, after England had batted poorly in the first matches of the tour, although he scored poorly in the match.  A score of 77 runs from 100 balls in the fourth Test saw him retain his place for the remainder of the five-match series, and he was selected to tour the West Indies in early 2022.

Crawley scored his second Test century during the first match of the West Indies tour, and his innings of 121 saw Viv Richards describe him as "a magnificent player". His performances in the other two matches of the series, however, led to critics questioning his shot selection, especially outside off stump, with the perception that he needed to address his tendency to be out playing an off drive, particularly when the ball is swinging.

After being selected in the Test match squad for England's tour of Pakistan in late 2022―the side's first Test match tour of Pakistan since 2005― Crawley opened the batting in the first match of the series. He was one of four England batsmen to score a century in their first innings, and came close to becoming the first England player to score a century before lunch on the first day of a Test match. He scored rapidly on a "very flat pitch", making 122 runs and reaching his century in 86 balls, setting a record for the fastest century by an England Test opener. He scored a half-century in similar style in England's second innings and played in each of the remaining matches in the series.

References

External links

1998 births
Living people
English cricketers
England Test cricketers
England One Day International cricketers
Kent cricketers
People educated at Tonbridge School
People from Bromley
English cricketers of the 21st century
Wisden Cricketers of the Year
London Spirit cricketers